Abdenour Amachaibou (born 22 January 1987) is a professional footballer who plays for SC 08 Elsdorf. Born in Germany, he has represented both Germany and Morocco at youth level.

References

External links

1987 births
Living people
Moroccan footballers
German footballers
Germany youth international footballers
Borussia Dortmund II players
Alemannia Aachen players
SC Fortuna Köln players
Türkiyemspor Berlin players
SpVgg Unterhaching players
SSV Jahn Regensburg players
SC Preußen Münster players
2. Bundesliga players
3. Liga players
Association football midfielders
People from Düren
Sportspeople from Cologne (region)
Footballers from North Rhine-Westphalia